Cockspur Island is an island in the south channel of the Savannah River near Lazaretto Creek, northwest of Tybee Island, Georgia, United States.  Most of the island is within the boundaries of Fort Pulaski National Monument. The island was so named on account of its bent shape.  It was originally called Pepper Island and is also called Long Island.

Historic buildings on the island include Fort Pulaski (built in 1847) and the Cockspur Island Lighthouse (built in 1837–39), designed by John S. Norris, the New York City architect.

History
The founder of Methodism, John Wesley landed at the island on February 6, 1736, and a monument marks the spot where Wesley conducted a service of thanksgiving.  During the American Civil War, the Battle of Fort Pulaski was fought on the island, in which the United States Army captured the fort from the Confederate States Army on April 11, 1862.  Confederate soldiers were imprisoned in the fort. During the Spanish–American War, a coastal artillery battery, Battery Hambright, was built on the island; it was reactivated during World War I and World War II.

Photos

References

Protected areas of Chatham County, Georgia
Islands of Georgia (U.S. state)
History of Methodism in the United States
Georgia (U.S. state) Sea Islands
Islands of Chatham County, Georgia